Hippotis is a genus of flowering plants belonging to the family Rubiaceae.

Its native range is Central and Southern Tropical America.

Species:

Hippotis albiflora 
Hippotis antioquiana 
Hippotis brevipes 
Hippotis brevistipula 
Hippotis comosa 
Hippotis ecuatoriana 
Hippotis elegantula 
Hippotis grandiflora 
Hippotis hirsutissima 
Hippotis lasseri 
Hippotis mollis 
Hippotis panamensis 
Hippotis peruviana 
Hippotis stellata 
Hippotis subelongata 
Hippotis triflora 
Hippotis tubiflora 
Hippotis vasqueziana

References

Dialypetalantheae
Rubiaceae genera